Taneja is an Indian (Arora) surname.

Notable people with the surname, who may or may not be affiliated with the clan, include:
 Arjit Taneja, Indian television actor
 Ishika Taneja, Miss India 2017–2018
 Namish Taneja, Indian television actor
 Preti Taneja, British writer
 Shweta Taneja, Indian novelist, graphic novelist, and journalist

References

Indian surnames
Punjabi-language surnames
Surnames of Indian origin
Hindu surnames
Khatri clans
Khatri surnames
Arora clans